Na Yung–Nam Som National Park is a national park in Nam Som District, Udon Thani Province, Thailand.

Geography
Na Yung–Nam Som National Park is in the area where Udon Thani, Loei, and Nong Khai Provinces meet. The topography condition is slope complex mountainous above 200–500 m in elevation. The highest peak is Phu Ya-u at about 588 m. The forest condition is still abundant. The park is the main source of the area's rivers and streams, such as Huai Nam Som and Huai Tat Ton. Soils are sandy loam in dry evergreen and mixed deciduous forests and lateritic soils in dry dipterocarp forests. Most of the rocks found are sandstone.

History
The area became a forest park in December 1975. Anno 2022 it is still a national park in preparation, with an area of 248,259 rai ~ .

Climate
Due to the monsoon, summers are hot, about 40° Celsius between March and May. The rainy season runs from June to October and the winter from November to February with the temperature of about 10-20° Celsius. Rainfall is about 1,000-1,500 mm yearly.

Flora and fauna
Forest conditions are dry dipterocarp forests distributed along foothills and hill ranges. The main species are Shorea obtasa, S. siamensis, and Dipterocarpus tuberculatus. Lower plants are Vietnamosasa pusilla, Curcuma sp. Down the valley is mixed deciduous forest, Dalbergia oliveri, Xylia xylocarpa, Pterocarpus macrocarpus, Sindora siamensis, and various species of bamboo such as Gigantochloa albocilliata, Bambusa bambos, Dendrocalamus sp. are found. Along the riverside is dry evergreen forest, Afzelia xylocarpa Anisoptera costata, Dipterocarpus spp. Lagerstoemia spp., Hopea sp. Symbiosis species like orchid and fern are present. Undergrowth species are rattan, palm, and herbs.

Sights

Pha Daeng Viewpoint   
Pha Daeng viewpoint is about 1,500 m from the national park office. Along the nature trail to Yung Thong Waterfall, Pha Daeng is sandstone slope cliff, where a large beautiful lower scenery can be observed. Next to Pha Daeng, there is a tiny cave that used to be a meditation site for Luang Pu Man Phurithatto. Yung Thong Waterfall Nature Trail passes Yung Thong and Tat Noi Waterfalls and Pha Daeng Viewpoint for 2,000 m.

See also
List of national parks of Thailand
List of Protected Areas Regional Offices of Thailand

References

National parks of Thailand
Geography of Udon Thani province
Tourist attractions in Udon Thani province